Pitcairnia longissimiflora is a species of plant in the genus Pitcairnia that is endemic to Bolivia. Its dangling flowers of  consist of white or pale green petals.

References

Sources

longissimiflora
Flora of Bolivia